Louella D. Everett (1883–1967), Poetry anthologist and Associate Editor of the 11th
 
and 12th
 
editions of Bartlett's Familiar Quotations. Also published two poetry anthologies: The Cat in Verse 

and Home and Holiday Verse 
. For many years she was a contributor to the New York Times Book Review, helping readers to find the sources of bits of verse.

Louella D. Everett of Boston, Mass.,
Must be an industrious, painstaking lass;
I'm sure she refuses the diners and dancers
To devote all her time to Queries and Answers

At one time, her fame was such that she was the topic of a short piece in The Talk of the Town.

References 

1883 births
1967 deaths
20th-century American poets
American women poets
20th-century American women writers